Star Trek: The Next Generation – A World for All Seasons was a Star Trek adventure game under development by Spectrum HoloByte for the 3DO Interactive Multiplayer game console. While the game was promoted in early 1994 in popular media of the time, including the gaming magazine Electronic Gaming Monthly, it was never completed.

Overview
The game was purported to be an adventure built around complex, pre-rendered 3D locations. It was to play as a kind of "choose your own adventure", with the player given options and choices that progress the story depending on how the player decides to proceed. Pre-release screenshots show 3D environments and characters, including alien worlds, alien peoples, the cast of the television show, and the USS Enterprise (NCC-1701-D).

In addition, there was to be a real-time space combat mode. In pre-release screenshots, this mode appeared to be similar in style to space shooter games such as the Wing Commander series.

References

Adventure games
Cancelled 3DO Interactive Multiplayer games
World for All Seasons
Video games developed in the United States
Spectrum HoloByte games